Stephen G. Haines (1945–2012) was an American organizational theorist, management consultant, author of books on  management   and systems thinking.

Biography 
Stephen Haines earned a B.S. in  Engineering  from the United States Naval Academy. He also worked for a doctorate in Management  and Educational Psychology from Temple University, but did not complete the dissertation He received a Master of Science in Administration in Organization Development under Richard F. Ericson and Jerry Harvey at the George Washington University.

As a former U.S. Naval officer, he flew Navy jets, piloted ships, and served off Vietnam. In the 1970s, Haines worked as an executive and consultant. He was Executive Vice President of Imperial Corporation of America, a nationwide financial services firm that filed for bankruptcy in 1990. and Senior Vice President of Freddie Mac. He also held executive positions with MCI Inc., Exxon, Sunoco, and Marriott Corporation. In the 1980s, he was president of University Associates (UA) Consulting and Training Services. He founded the Haines Centre for Strategic Management in 1990, serving as CEO; the firm now has  a network of offices in over 25 countries. He was very active in the formulation of the Association for Strategic Planning's strategic planning certification program.

Haines died in San Diego, California on July 2, 2012.

Work

Strategic Management System 
To develop a strategic management system, Haines (2000) suggested using the "Systems Thinking Approach" and its five-phased (ABCDE) Systems Thinking model that invites the leader to ask and answer five important questions: 
(A) Where do we want to be?
(B) How will we know when we get there?
(C) Where are we right now?
(D) How do we get there from here?, and
(E) What is changing in the future external environment, that we need to take into account?
These five questions "align directly with the five phases of a system: (1) output, (2) feedback loop, (3) input, and (4) throughput/actions (5) within the dynamic and changing environment".

Publications 
Haines wrote more than 16 books, over 50 articles, and developed 12 volumes of the Haines' Strategic Library. A selection:
 1995. Sustaining High Performance:The Strategic Transformation to a Customer Focused Learning Organization,with Katie McCoy
 1998. Manager's Pocket Guide to Strategic and Business Planning  The Systems Thinking Approach
 2000. Successful Career and Life Planning: The Systems Thinking Approach
 2000. Systems Thinking Approach to Strategic Planning and Management
 2002. Successful Strategic Human Resource Planning, with Allan Bandt
 2004. ABCs of Strategic Management: An Executive Briefing and Plan-to-Plan Day on Strategic Management in the 21st Century
 2005. Enterprise-Wide Change: Superior Results Through Systems Thinking, with Gail Aller-Stead and James McKinlay
 2007. Pearls of Wisdom:Facilitation Tools, Tips, and Techniques for Group Leaders, Managers and Executives

References

External links 
 Stephen Haines Homepage.
 Keynote presentation on systems thinking by Stephen Haines, 2005.

1945 births
American business theorists
American management consultants
George Washington University alumni
American systems scientists
Temple University alumni
United States Naval Academy alumni
2012 deaths